is a retired Japanese female volleyball player. She announced her retirement from Hitachi Rivale club and the national team on 27 May 2021.

She was part of the Japan women's national volleyball team. 
She participated at the 2017 FIVB Volleyball Women's World Grand Champions Cup, and the  2018 FIVB Volleyball Women's Nations League.

Personal life 
On September 26, 2021, she announced her marriage. She married Naonobu Fujii, a setter of Toray Arrows and Japan men's national volleyball team who died on March 10, 2023 from stomach cancer.

References

External links 

 FIVB profile

1993 births
Living people
Japanese women's volleyball players
Place of birth missing (living people)
Japan women's international volleyball players